The WAGR Q class was a six-member class of 4-6-2T tank engine steam locomotives operated by the Western Australian Government Railways (WAGR) between 1896 and 1925.

History
In April 1896, the WAGR placed an order with R&W Hawthorn Leslie & Co for four 4-6-2T locomotives. Meanwhile, the builder had two very similar locomotives that had been built in 1895 for the Portos e Caminhos de Ferro de Moçambique, Mozambique as part of a cancelled order. A deal was done in May 1896 for the WAGR to purchase them and they entered service in August 1896. The other four entered service in 1896/97. The 1895 built locomotives had different shaped cab windows and side tanks.

They were employed as shunters at Fremantle and Midland. In 1905, Q140 was rebuilt with a new boiler and converted to 4-6-4T configuration with water and coal capacity increased to make it suitable to operate on the Upper Darling Range Railway, Q141-Q143 followed in 1909. They were reclassified as the Qa class.

They operated branch line services on the Mundaring, Mundaring Weir, Pinjarra-Holyoake and Upper Darling Range lines as well as on the Eastern Railway to Northam and South Western Railway to Bunbury. All were withdrawn in 1924/25.

Class list
The numbers and periods in service of each member of the Q class were as follows:

Namesakes
The Q class designation was reused for the Q class locomotives that were introduced in 1931. It was reused in the 1990s when the Westrail Q class diesel locomotives entered service.

See also

Rail transport in Western Australia
List of Western Australian locomotive classes

References

Notes

Cited works

Hawthorn Leslie and Company locomotives
Railway locomotives introduced in 1896
Q WAGR class (1895)
3 ft 6 in gauge locomotives of Australia
4-6-2T locomotives
Scrapped locomotives
Passenger locomotives